Rev. Msgr. Louis O'Donovan, S.T.L. (July 24, 1872 – October 9, 1949) was an American religious historian and parish priest of St. Martin's Church, Baltimore.

Biography
Louis O'Donovan was born in Baltimore on July 24, 1872.

He contributed to the 1913 Catholic Encyclopaedia and translated Henry VIII of England's pro-papal 1521 book, Assertio septem sacramentorum, from Latin into English.

He was educated at Loyola High School, Loyola College, and studied for the priesthood at St. Charles College, St. Mary's Seminary, and the Catholic University.

He died at Bon Secours Hospital in Baltimore on October 9, 1949.

References

1872 births
1949 deaths
American historians
American Christian clergy
Catholic University of America alumni
Contributors to the Catholic Encyclopedia
Loyola Blakefield alumni
Loyola University Maryland alumni
St. Charles College alumni
St. Mary's Seminary and University alumni